Damian Kratzenberg (November 5, 1878 – October 11, 1946) was a highschool teacher who became head of the Volksdeutsche Bewegung (German-People's Movement), a pro-Nazi political group, in Luxembourg during World War II. He was executed after the war for collaboration with the Nazis.

He was the son of the administrator of the castle of Clervaux, a German immigrant. After receiving his baccalaureate at the Diekirch gymnasium, from 1898 to 1902 he studied literature in Luxembourg, Lille, Paris and Berlin. Following this, he taught Greek and German in Diekirch, Echternach, and from 1927 at the Athénée de Luxembourg.

From 1927 to 1936, he was a member of the liberal party. From the mid-1930s, he became a supporter of Nazi Germany. From 1935 to 1940, he was the president of GEDELIT, the Luxemburger Gesellschaft für deutsche Literatur und Kunst (Society for German Literature and Art). In 1936, he received the Goethe-Medaille für Kunst und Wissenschaft.

He became head of the regional branch of the Volksdeutsche Bewegung in 1940, and was appointed head of the Athénée de Luxembourg in 1941. 

Damian Kratzenberg, managed to flee towards Weißenburg a few days before the liberation on 1 September 1944. A letter to his daughter after the end of the war, however, gave his location away. He was brought to Luxembourg and put on trial. On 1 August Kratzenberg was sentenced to death and on 11 October 1946 was shot at the shooting range of the barracks of the Holy Ghost Plateau in Luxembourg City.

See also 
 Luxembourgish collaboration with Nazi Germany

Further reading 
 Biographical Dictionary of the Extreme Right Since 1890 edited by Philip Rees, 1991,

External links
 Luxemburg Collaborationist Forces in World War II
  The Grand Duchy of Luxembourg

References 

Luxembourgian politicians
Luxembourgian educators
Luxembourgian fascists
Executed Luxembourgian people
20th-century executions by Luxembourg
Luxembourgian people of World War II
Nazis from outside Germany
1878 births
1946 deaths
People from Clervaux
Executed Luxembourgian collaborators with Nazi Germany
People executed by firing squad
Nazi politicians
People executed by Luxembourg